is a form of  and a traditional , with a range of different applications, weaving styles and appearances. Japanese bamboo weaving is particularly well known for its use in basket weaving.

History

More than six hundred species of bamboo, some endemic to the island, grow in Japan. Although defined as a subfamily of grasses, bamboo is characterized by its woody culm and a root system that can form either thick, slowly spreading clusters or more aggressive runners. Qualities such as the strength and flexibility of a bamboo variety differ widely, with some types considered more suitable for use in bamboo crafts than others.

Bamboo has characteristics which, over time, have led to its frequent usage in Japanese culture and the development of symbolism associated with its qualities. It is a fast-growing, straight-limbed and flexible plant, does not decay quickly once cut, and can be used for building shelters, weapons, instruments and containers. Young bamboo shoots, which are edible, form a part of traditional Japanese cuisine, and bamboo is a common theme in Japanese literature and painting.

Along with evergreen pine trees and plum blossoms – the first flower of spring – bamboo is a part of the traditional Three Friends of Winter motif, commonly seen on kimono worn for auspicious occasions as a symbol of perseverance and resilience. Japanese artists have often represented bamboo enduring inclement weather, such as rain or snow, reflecting its reputation for being flexible but unbreakable, and its association with steadfastness and loyalty.

Flower baskets for  called  and other types were imported from China or their style copied. These  baskets had formal, symmetrical structures with tightly plaited weaves. It was the 16th century tea master Sen no Rikyū (1522–1591) who advocated for a simple, austere  style with natural and spontaneous or seemingly artless utensils. These tea utensils established a Japanese bamboo art distinct from the imported Chinese style. Baskets were developed to appear in a natural, asymmetric style, called . Around 1700, the embrace of the steeped Japanese tea ceremony coincided with a renewed admiration for Chinese culture, literature, and painting among the Japanese literati, a phenomenon that continued into the 19th century. Finely woven, elegant baskets imported from China served as models for  baskets now created by Japanese craftsmen, following a tradition established during the Muromachi period (1392–1573). Recognition of bamboo craftsmanship as a traditional Japanese decorative art began at the end of the 19th century, and became accepted as an art form.

The Bamboo Technical Training Support Centre in the town of Ōita was established in 1938, making it the only publicly funded prefectural-level institution in the country that is dedicated to bamboo crafts. Following World War II, bamboo crafts disappeared as plastic replaced it for utilitarian products. Nevertheless, high-level production remained and art forms developed apart from crafts. Bamboo art gained increasing recognition. In 1967,  (1904–1974) from Beppu became the first bamboo artist to be nominated by the government as a Living National Treasure. In 1979, the bamboo crafts of Beppu were designated by the Ministry of Economy, Trade and Industry in 1979 as a Traditional Arts and Crafts.

Most of the master artisans designated Living National Treasures are selected from among participants in the annual Japan Kōgei Association exhibitions. Whereas the annual Japan Art Academy exhibitions emphasize artistic expression, the Art and Crafts exhibitions prioritize the preservation of traditional skills and typically feature functional, though modern, baskets. In the postwar era, many of the leading bamboo artists were linked to established lineages.

Bamboo art of recent decades, despite its practitioners holding the same respect for tradition and lineage as bamboo artists through history, reflects a greater diversity in technique and vision. Notable artists have come to the craft from outside the traditional family lines, and many work independently. Some have a background in the fine arts, while others found themselves attracted to the practice after having worked in an unrelated field.

As is similar in other Japanese crafts, the acquisition of knowledge usually involved a lengthy apprenticeship with the master of the workshop, often the father of the young disciple, in a system called . Learning the basic skills and techniques generally takes five to ten years, but mastering them and developing an individual style can require decades. In previous centuries, a student apprenticed to a master would be required to work hard almost every day in exchange for little or no pay; an apprentice would live in their master's household and would also be expected to participate in household duties. Before beginning any training, an apprentice would be expected to simply observe their master and other more senior students at work; even older, more experienced students would typically learn through this method of observation. In more recent times, this method of apprenticeship has changed and is no longer typical or common, with students of bamboo weaving instead learning basic skills in technical schools, such as the centre in Ōita, before later going to a master.

While some bamboo works can be completed in several weeks, others take many months, and exhibition pieces often require longer, sometimes a year or two. Bamboo arts have a low profile compared to ceramics, mainly because of the comparatively low number of artisans, and the amount of time it takes to finish an object.

Bamboo basketry is often complemented with other materials such as rattan or hemp palm; basketry of only these materials also exist.

The three main production areas of bamboo weaving are the western Kansai region around the cities of Osaka and Kyoto, the eastern Kantō region around Tokyo, and the southernmost island of Kyushu. Each have their own techniques and styles of weaving bamboo.

Kansai artisans

Of items woven from bamboo in Japan, sophisticated  flower baskets and tea utensil baskets were historically in especially high demand in the western region of Kansai, with Osaka and Kyoto at its centre. In the late 19th century, master craftsmen in the region began combining technical perfection with artistic individuality to produce functional "art baskets" that were signed by the artist. The pioneering Kansai bamboo artist , is believed to be the first master to have signed his baskets, studied the traditional craft of rattan plaiting, and concentrated on  tea utensils. His eldest son, Shōkōsai II (1860–1905), followed him into the basketry trade but died at an early age. He was succeeded by his younger brother, Shōkosai III (1864–1922), who developed an advanced style of plaiting called "coarse weave", a departure from the family's signature techniques. After World War II, Shōkōsai IV (1902–1975) moved from Osaka to Kyoto, where he established the new family workshop. Shōkōsai V (1932–2011) explored further possibilities in armor plaiting, a type of parallel construction considered one of the traditional Hayakawa techniques. He exhibited his work at the annual Japanese Traditional Art Crafts Exhibitions beginning in 1966 and was designated a Living National Treasure in 2003.

The Osaka-based bamboo artist  established an important and long-lasting lineage of masters. He was known for his precise, delicate plaiting techniques, making primarily  (Chinese-style) baskets and utensils for the  tea ceremony. He developed the so-called  style of basketry after studying the 18th century paintings of Yanagisawa Kien, who often depicted bamboo baskets filled with flowers or fruits in the  literati style. Chikuunsai made  baskets explicitly for exhibition, a trend that marked a significant shift in Japanese bamboo art, reflecting the ambition of master craftsmen to achieve the same degree of recognition already accorded contemporary ceramic and lacquer artists. Tanabe Chikuunsai II (1910–2000) and Chikuunsai III (1940–2014) extended the Tanabe lineage, with the latter producing unique geometric sculptures.

He was also one of the first bamboo craftsmen whose work was admitted to the  exhibition of the Imperial Fine Arts Academy.

, also from Sakai, established his own distinguished family line. He began his career producing  and literati baskets, but then developed a unique method of using natural bamboo branches and roots to achieve a more rustic effect. He also made several pieces for the Imperial Court. Chikubōsai II (1917–2003) produced both  baskets and modern vessels made from round strips of bent-and-gathered bamboo. Beginning in the Taishō period, both Tanabe Chikuunsai I and Maeda Chikubōsai I incorporated antique arrows into their work, which was particularly appreciated by clients who were descended from samurai.

One of the artists who was influenced by Tanabe Chikuunsai II is Sugita Jozan ( 1932 in Osaka).

 made thousands of utilitarian baskets for wholesalers for two decades after WWII. He later made a number of artistic pieces with extremely fine strips of bamboo and intricate techniques. He lives near Hiroshima in the neighbouring Chūgoku region.

Kantō artisans
Japanese bamboo art in the eastern region of Kantō around Tokyo underwent a process of modernization during the first half of the 20th century. Several masters rose to fame through their participation in newly reorganized domestic art international exhibitions and began producing "art baskets".

 and his brother  spearheaded the movement, pioneering new directions for the field and elevating bamboo craft to an art form. Emphasizing artistic freedom and individuality, Rōkansai experimented with the possibilities of the medium and developed several new techniques, including bundled plaiting and embroidered plaiting. He received an award in the 1925 International Exhibition of Modern Decorative and Industrial Arts in Paris. (1919–2004), who trained under his father, the famous Rōkansai, regularly exhibited his works at the annual  exhibition and the Traditional Art and Crafts exhibitions, and was designated a Living National Treasure in 1982.

I (1872–1936) might have been connected to the  lineage.

 (1930–2013) is an artist working in Tokyo.

 (born 1949) had his apprenticeship under  (1925–1996) and is based in Kanagawa. His produces installation art in a highly individualistic style.

artisans
He studied under  (1911–1986) He specializes in bent-bamboo works and has won renown for his large-scale abstract compositions.

His disciple  (b. 1959), working on Sado Island, employs a flexible local variety of bamboo in works inspired by the island's flora and fauna.

 initially had no interest in becoming a bamboo artist and did not formally study under his father. He nevertheless submitted a work which was accepted by the Tokyo Craft Arts Exhibition when he was fourteen years old. Subsequently, he worked with bamboo and after the end World War II, the Niigata Prefectural government hired him to teach bamboo basketry. His work was admitted to the  exhibitions, and in 1955 he became one of the seventeen founding members of the Japan Bamboo Artists Association. He eventually stopped producing works for public exhibitions and focused towards design and small items, working for example together with fashion designer Issey Miyake.  (1925–1996) was trained by him.

Inspired by this piece, he eventually submitted works to the Japanese Modern Art & Craft exhibitions and received a Special Recognition Award at the 2006 .

He moved to the Tokyo area later, and made large-scale compositions for which he earned recognition.

 (b. 1952) is an artist from Shizuoka Prefecture. He initially studied  dyeing techniques, but moved to bamboo weaving after working at his grandfather's bamboo wholesale enterprise. His organic, sculptural baskets and three-dimensional abstract sculptural works owe their appearance to a variety of traditions. He works as an independent artist and is not associated with any particular organisations.

Kyūshū artisans
With a warm southern climate ideal for bamboo cultivation, the island of Kyūshū is the site of more than half of Japan's bamboo production. In the
The Ōita Prefectural Bamboo Craft and Technical Training Support Center, a publicly funded institution dedicated to bamboo craft, was established in 1938.

The artist  (1904–1974) attracted numerous disciples over the course of his long career. His abstract bamboo sculptures of the 1950s and 1960s were considered revolutionary. In 1967 he became the first bamboo artist honoured with the title "Living National Treasure".  (b. 1942), his son and heir to the family tradition, typically uses leached bamboo split into wide strips and combines parallel construction with plaiting to achieve a textural, multilayered effect.

(b. 1951), one of 's students, prefers functional vessels and employs classical plaiting techniques.

Techniques 

A number of bamboo plaiting and weaving techniques have developed in Japan in different regions throughout time. There are a number of standard weaving patterns, out of which hundreds of combinations can be made.

 Chrysanthemum base plaiting
This technique is sometimes translated as 'bull's-eye plaiting' or 'snake-eye plaiting'.
 Clematis plaiting, a variation of hexagonal plaiting
 Diamond twill plaiting, known as floral twill plaiting when repeatedly used as design over a large area.
 Octagonal plaiting
 Pine needle plaiting, called "waive plaiting" when same orientation is used for every row
 Plover plaiting
 Square plaiting, or cross pattern
 Thousand-line construction, or comb plaiting. Technically not plaiting, but aligning elements parallel to each other and then fastening them with any of the above methods. Also known as "parallel construction".
 Twill plaiting, or netting plaiting
 Twining

Bamboo weaving in art

Both bamboo and bamboo weaving in particular are a commonly depicted theme in many traditional Japanese artforms.

See also 
 Chinese bamboo weaving
 Taiwanese bamboo weaving
  in Korea

References

Further reading

External links 

 Artist Name List, Bamboo Basket Database | Ritsumeikan University
 
 https://www.youtube.com/watch?v=k8KJFYNJ-eY 
 https://www.youtube.com/watch?v=bY1LRLsCbOs

Bamboo weaving
Basket weaving